Lebyazhye is a rural locality (a selo) and the administrative center of Lebyazhinsky Selsoviet, Yegoryevsky District, Altai Krai, Russia. The population was 1,291 as of 2013. There are 8 streets.

Geography 
Lebyazhye is located 9 km south of Novoyegoryevskoye (the district's administrative centre) by road. Peresheyechny is the nearest rural locality.

References 

Rural localities in Yegoryevsky District, Altai Krai